The Flaming Lips is the debut release by American rock group The Flaming Lips, released in 1984.

Re-releases
The EP was remastered and re-released as part of the compilation Finally the Punk Rockers Are Taking Acid. "Bag Full of Thoughts" was lifted for the retrospective compilation A Collection of Songs Representing an Enthusiasm for Recording...By Amateurs. In 2014, it was re-released on vinyl, with the cover art altered to an abstract illustration of the original photograph used on the original release. The EP in its entirety was included on the rarities album Scratching the Door: The First Recordings of the Flaming Lips, with "Garden of Eyes" and "Forever Is A Long Time" being split into two separate tracks.

Track listing

Personnel
Wayne Coyne - guitars
Mark Coyne - vocals
Michael Ivins - bass guitar
Richard English - drums

References

1984 debut EPs
The Flaming Lips EPs
Restless Records EPs